The Ghana School of Law (GSL) is an educational institution in Ghana for training lawyers.
The school is the only one that provides training for law graduates in the Barrister at Law program.

The Professional Law Course is designed for Law Graduates who have obtained an LLB degree and have passed the entrance examination.  On completion of this course the graduate is qualified to practice law in Ghana.
Until the Ghana School of Law was established in 1958, all lawyers in Ghana were trained abroad, almost always at the Inns of Court in England.

By convention all lawyers admitted to practice in Ghana become automatic members of the Ghana Bar Association.

History of the Ghana  School of Law
After Ghana attained independence in 1957, the development of legal education was discussed after which the legal practitioner's Act, 1958 was enacted which gave birth to General Legal Council  https://www.glc.gov.gh/. The council was charged with the responsibility of organizing legal education in Ghana. The first African Chief Justice of Ghana Sir Kobina Arku Korsah, appointed Professor J.H. A Lang as the first Director of Legal Education to ensure the administration and supervision of Legal Education and also the establishment of some courses on instruction.
The main campus of the Ghana School of Law is at Makola in Accra.
There are other satellite campuses also subsequently established at Kwame Nkrumah University of Science and Technology in Kumasi to open a second School of Law there.
And finally at GIMPA campus near Legon.
The Kumasi campus of the GSL was officially inaugurated in November 2010 by Her Ladyship Mrs. Justice Georgina Theodora Woode, Chief Justice of the Republic of Ghana

See also
B. J. Da Rocha 
Peter Ala Adjetey 
V.C.R.A.C. Crabbe

References

Ghana School of Law Journal 1991

 
Law schools in Ghana
Educational institutions established in 1958
1958 establishments in Ghana